Medieval Lords: Soldier Kings of Europe is a 1991 video game published by Strategic Simulations.

Gameplay
Medieval Lords: Soldier Kings of Europe is a game in which players manage a medieval European kingdom.

Reception
Chuck Moss reviewed the game for Computer Gaming World, and stated that "Medieval Lords is an entertaining and challenging computer game, despite — or, perhaps, because of — its limitations."

Janice Greaves for Run said that "Medieval Lords is well suited to solitaire, multi-player and classroom use."

Reviews
Computer Gaming World - Jun, 1993
Compute!
Power Play - 1991-10

References

1991 video games
Commodore 64 games
DOS games
Strategic Simulations games
Turn-based strategy video games
Video games developed in the United States
Video games set in Europe
Video games set in the Middle Ages